Serine/threonine-protein kinase N1 is an enzyme that in humans is encoded by the PKN1 gene.

Function 

The protein encoded by this gene belongs to the protein kinase C superfamily. This kinase is activated by Rho family of small G proteins and may mediate the Rho-dependent signaling pathway. This kinase can be activated by phospholipids and by limited proteolysis. The 3-phosphoinositide dependent protein kinase-1 (PDPK1/PDK1) is reported to phosphorylate this kinase, which may mediate insulin signals to the actin cytoskeleton. The proteolytic activation of this kinase by caspase-3 or related proteases during apoptosis suggests its role in signal transduction related to apoptosis. Alternatively spliced transcript variants encoding distinct isoforms have been observed.

Interactions 

Protein kinase N1 has been shown to interact with:

 AKAP9, 
 Actinin, alpha 1, 
 CCDC85B, 
 NEFL, 
 NEUROD2 
 Phosphoinositide-dependent kinase-1, 
 Phospholipase D1, 
 RHOA, and
 Vimentin. 
 TRAF1.

References

Further reading 

 
 
 
 
 
 
 
 
 
 
 
 
 
 
 
 
 
 
 

EC 2.7.11